The Corps of Intelligence Police (CIP) was founded by Ralph Van Deman in 1917 as an intelligence agency within the United States Army, and the War Department. In World War I, many of the intelligence disciplines still in use today were deployed for the first time: aerial photography, signals intercept, interrogation teams, and counterintelligence agents.

Army Intelligence within the continental United States and intelligence in support of the forces overseas developed along two separate tracks. On the home front, COL Ralph Van Deman, Chief of the Military Intelligence Division of the War Department General Staff, directed much of his attention to the new field of negative intelligence, or counterintelligence. The Army was concerned about a possible threat from German spies and saboteurs. Van Deman used the newly created Corps of Intelligence Police to conduct undercover investigations of individuals and organizations. He was equally concerned about the loyalty of recent immigrants being drafted into service. Van Deman feared that the newly forming National Guard and National Army divisions might become “infested” with German agents and sympathizers. To protect the force, two soldiers within each company were appointed to secretly report on any suspicious activity, using the guidelines contained in a confidential pamphlet, “Provisional Counter-Espionage Instructions”.

Following the First World War the CIP was downsized and its budget cut until, by 1941, it had a staff of only 16. After the attack on Pearl Harbor a decision was made to reorganize and enlarge the CIP, which was renamed the Counter Intelligence Corps.

See also
 Modern Day U.S. Army Counterintelligence (Special Agents)
 Historical U.S. Army Counterintelligence Corps
 The History of the Counter Intelligence Corps

References

External links 
 Intelligence & Security Command Online Museum: Corps of Intelligence Police

Branches of the United States Army
Military police units and formations of the United States Army
Defunct United States intelligence agencies
Military units and formations established in 1917
Military units and formations disestablished in 1941